Johannes Alberti, O.P. was a Roman Catholic prelate who served as Auxiliary Bishop of Halberstadt (1550–?).

Biography
Johannes Alberti was ordained a priest in the Order of Preachers. On 27 Jun 1550, he was appointed during the papacy of Pope Julius III as Auxiliary Bishop of Halberstadt and Titular Bishop of Tripolis in Phoenicia. It is uncertain how long he served.

See also 
Catholic Church in Germany

References 

16th-century German Roman Catholic bishops
Bishops appointed by Pope Julius III
Dominican bishops